Rodolfo Rodolfi-Sforza (1594–1626) was a Roman Catholic prelate who served as Bishop of Pula (1625–1626).

Biography
Rodolfi-Sforza was born in Padova, Italy and ordained a priest on 22 December 1624. On 3 March 1625, he was appointed by Pope Urban VIII as Bishop of Pula. He served as Bishop of Pula until his death in 1626.

References

External links and additional sources
 (for Chronology of Bishops) 
 (for Chronology of Bishops) 

17th-century Roman Catholic bishops in Croatia
1594 births
1626 deaths
Bishops appointed by Pope Urban VIII